In woodworking and the decorative arts, refinishing refers to the act of repairing or reapplying the wood finishing on an object. In practice, this may apply to the paint or wood finish top coat, lacquer or varnish. The artisan or restorer is traditionally aiming for an improved or restored and renewed finish. Refinishing can apply to a variety of surfaces and materials such as wood, glass, metal, plastic and paint, although in Britain, when referring to wood or wooden furniture it is commonly known as repolishing - short for re-French Polishing. 

There are a great variety of both traditional and modern finishes, including the use of faux finishes.  One interesting modern development in refinishing is the art of distressing or antiquing, making the finishes of pieces look older.

While refinishing is often undertaken to salvage an old piece of furniture, in the case of antique furniture refinishing has been known to significantly reduce the overall value of the piece.

See also 
 Patina
 Glaze (painting technique)
 Metal leaf
 Faux painting

References

Decorative arts
Furniture
Woodworking